Kaun Kare Kurbanie is a 1991 Indian Hindi-language film produced and directed by Arjun Hingorani. It stars Dharmendra, Govinda and Anita Raj in pivotal roles.

Cast
 Dharmendra as Police Inspector Arjun Singh
 Govinda as Ajit "Munna" Singh
 Anita Raj as Anita A. Singh
 Hemant Birje as Hemant
 Parijat as Priti "Guddi"
 Sonika Gill as Sonia
 Arjun Hingorani as Laxmichand
 Biswajeet as Police Commissioner
 Deepak Tijori as Deepak
 Bhavna Balsavar as Laxmichand Fake Daughter 
 Tej Sapru as Tej Singh

Songs
"Hoga Na Hoga" (Part 1) - Sadhana Sargam
"Hoga Na Hoga" (Part 2) - Sadhana Sargam, Sonali Bajpai
"Hoga Na Hoga" (Part 3) - Suresh Wadkar, Sadhana Sargam
"Anu Menu I Love You" - Sadhana Sargam, Alka Yagnik, Suresh Wadkar
"Hoga Na Hoga" (Part 4) - Suresh Wadkar
"Tere Hatho Ne Chhua" - Suresh Wadkar
"Tu Meri Laila Mai Tera Chaila" - Kajal, Sadhana Sargam, Kumar Sanu

External links
 
 

1990s Hindi-language films
1991 films
Films scored by Kalyanji Anandji